The Dogul language, Dogul Dom, is a Dogon language spoken in Mali. It is closest to Bondum Dogon, though not enough for mutual intelligibility.

References

Sources
 .

External links
Dogul wordlist (Dendo and Blench, 2005)

Dogon languages
Languages of Mali